Pieter Aldrich and Danie Visser were the defending champions, but decided to not compete this year after winning the Australian Open 2 weeks earlier.

Kelly Jones and Robert Van't Hof won the title by defeating Glenn Layendecker and Richey Reneberg 2–6, 7–6, 6–3 in the final.

Seeds

Draw

Draw

References

External links
 Official results archive (ATP)
 Official results archive (ITF)

Doubles